Reusch is a worldwide operating manufacturer of sports equipment for football (mainly goalkeeper gloves) and winter sports.

History 
In 1934, Karl Reusch manufactured his first pair of gloves in the attic of his home. The first pairs were sewn by hand. In 1972, he developed the first glove for professional alpine athletes. Together with his son Gebhard, Reusch entered the industry with a collection of specially designed winter gloves. One year later in co-operation with German goalkeeper Sepp Maier, Gebhard Reusch developed the first goalkeeper glove with a latex palm in history. In 1989, Reusch introduced its first skiing apparel and 3 years later the first team sport collection. In the beginning of 2000, Reusch expanded their product portfolio with helmets and goggles. After 2004 Reusch focussed on developing and delivering alpine and goalkeeper gloves for amateurs and professionals.

Structure 
The company's headquarters have moved from Reutlingen, Germany to Bolzano, Italy on 1 June 2017. It has distributors in approx. 60 countries.

Collections 
Each year the company arranges one goalkeeper collection (goalkeeper gloves, apparel, protections and accessories) and one winter collection (Racing, Ski, Freeride, Mountaineering, Board, Nordic, Multifunction gloves) for children and adults available in shops worldwide.

Sponsoring 

The first goalkeeper that had been sponsored by Reusch was Sepp Maier at the Football World Cup 1974 in Germany. Over the years Reusch supported many international top-goalkeepers such as the World Cup winners Ubaldo Fillol (ARG, 1978), Nery Pumpido (ARG, 1986), Bodo Illgner (GER, 1990), Claudio Taffarel (BRA, 1994) and Marcos (BRA, 2002). With Dida from AC Milan (2002/03, 2006/07) and Júlio César from Inter Milan, Reusch goalkeepers have won three UEFA Champions League titles over the last 15 years. Amongst the top goalkeepers Hugo Lloris (Tottenham Hotspur and France national team), Wojciech Szczęsny (Juventus), Samir Handanovič (Inter Milan), Ralf Fährmann (FC Schalke 04) and Diego López (Espanyol Barcelona), Reusch currently sponsors more than 220 professional goalkeepers in the first national divisions all over the world.

In the Alpine ski sector Reusch collaborates with many World Cup athletes, such as Marcel Hirscher, Lindsey Vonn, Mikaela Shiffrin, Henrik Kristoffersen, Lara Gut, Alexis Pinturault and Anna Veith. Additionally Reusch is the official supplier of seven of the world's most successful ski federations (Austria, Switzerland, France, USA, Norway, Liechtenstein, Slovenia). With Gerlinde Kaltenbrunner (AUT), one of the world's most successful extreme alpinists trusts in Reusch gloves.

References

External links 

 
 "Fits like a glove". Interview in Total Football Magazine. Retrieved 17 September 2016.4

German companies established in 1934
Manufacturing companies established in 1934
Sporting goods manufacturers of Germany
Sporting goods manufacturers of Italy
Sportswear brands
Association football equipment
Sports gloves
Ski equipment manufacturers
German brands